The Godøy Tunnel is a subsea road tunnel which runs between the islands of Giske and Godøy in Giske Municipality, Møre og Romsdal county, Norway. It opened in 1989.

References

Subsea tunnels in Norway
Road tunnels in Møre og Romsdal
Giske
Norwegian County Road 658
1989 establishments in Norway
Tunnels completed in 1989